Gibbacousteau is a genus of sea snails, marine gastropod mollusks in the family Marginellidae, the margin snails.

Species
Species within the genus Gibbacousteau include:
 Gibbacousteau jacquesi Espinosa & Ortea, 2013

References

 Espinosa J. & Ortea J. (2013) Nuevas especies de los géneros Dentimargo Cossmann, 1899 y Eratoidea Weinkauff, 1879, y nuevo género de marginélido de la isla de la Guadeloupe, Antillas Menores, Mar Caribe (Mollusca: Neogastropoda: Marginellidae). Revista de la Academia Canaria de Ciencias, 25: 111–127.

Marginellidae